Koidula is a village in Setomaa Parish, Võru County, in southeastern Estonia, on the border with Russia. It's located few kilometers northwest of Russian town Pechory. Koidula is the border crossing point of Karisilla–Pechory road (nr. 63), Tartu–Pechory and Valga–Pechory railways. Currently only Tartu–Pechory line is open to freight traffic, Valga–Pechory is inactive. In 2011, a new railway station was built in the neighbouring Matsuri village. This enabled traffic between Tartu–Pechory and Valga–Pechory lines without crossing the Russian border. It is also theoretically possible to be used for traffic between Saint Petersburg and Riga.

Prior to the administrative reform of 2017, Koidula was part of Värska Parish in Põlva County.

Koidula has only 1 inhabitant (as of 1 January 2011).

References

Villages in Võru County
Estonia–Russia border crossings